Rhododendron rubiginosum (红棕杜鹃) is a rhododendron species native to Myanmar, and Sichuan, Xizang, and Yunnan in China, where it grows at altitudes of . The flowers are pink, red, or pale purple.

Synonyms
Rhododendron catapastum Balf.f. & Forrest
Rhododendron leclerei H.Lév.
Rhododendron leprosum Balf.f.
Rhododendron squarrosum Balf.f.
Rhododendron stenoplastum Balf.f. & Forrest

References

"Rhododendron rubiginosum", Franchet, Bull. Soc. Bot. France. 34: 282. 1887.

rubiginosum
Plants described in 1887
Flora of Myanmar
Flora of Sichuan
Flora of Xinjiang
Flora of Yunnan